Finnish Music Information Centre (Fimic) was an organization dedicated to the promotion and archiving of Finnish music. A member of the International Association of Music Information Centres (IAMIC), the International Association of Music Libraries (IAML) and the International Association of Sound and Audiovisual Archives (IASA), Fimic hosts a vast library of scores, parts, and recordings, and distributes unpublished sheet music. The organization covers nearly all genres of Finnish music, ranging from contemporary classical compositions to rock and folk music.

Music Export Finland Association (MUSEX) and Finnish Music Information Center Fimic (Fimic) merge in 2012 to form Music Finland.

References

External links
 Music Finland site

Music organisations based in Finland
Non-profit organisations based in Finland